is a railway station located in the city of  Kannami, Shizuoka Prefecture, Japan operated by the private railroad company Izuhakone Railway.

Lines
Izu-Nitta Station is served by the Sunzu Line, and is located 7.0 kilometers from the starting point of the line at Mishima Station.

Station layout
The station has two opposed side platforms connected by a level crossing. Platform 1 is the primary platform, and used for bidirectional traffic. Platform 2 is used only during commuting hours for traffic to Mishima. The station building is staffed.

Platforms

History 
Izu-Nitta Station was opened on June 30, 1921.

Passenger statistics
In fiscal 2017, the station was used by an average of 1650 passengers daily (boarding passengers only).

Surrounding area
Kannami Elementary School
Tagata Agricultural High School

See also
 List of Railway Stations in Japan

References

External links

 Official home page

Railway stations in Japan opened in 1921
Railway stations in Shizuoka Prefecture
Izuhakone Sunzu Line
Kannami, Shizuoka